A double inverted pendulum is the combination of the inverted pendulum and the double pendulum. The double inverted pendulum is unstable, meaning that it will fall down unless it is controlled in some way. The two main methods of controlling a double inverted pendulum are moving the base, as with the inverted pendulum, or by applying a torque at the pivot point between the two pendulums.

See also
Inverted pendulum
Inertia wheel pendulum
Furuta pendulum
Tuned mass damper

References

External links
 A dynamical simulation of a double inverted pendulum on an oscillatory base

Pendulums
Control engineering